Garuda Indonesian Airways Flight 892 was a scheduled international passenger flight of Garuda Indonesian Airways (now Garuda Indonesia) from Jakarta to Amsterdam with stopovers in Singapore, Bangkok, Bombay (now Mumbai), Karachi, Cairo, and Rome. On 28 May 1968, while operating the flight's Bombay to Karachi segment, the Convair CV-990-30A-5 jet airliner crashed during the climbout from Bombay–Santacruz Airport (now Chhatrapati Shivaji Maharaj International Airport). The aircraft crashed in Bilalpada village near the town of Nala Sopara, killing all 29 passengers and crew on board and one person on the ground. Although the cause of the accident is unclear, it presumably was caused by loss of control, which resulted from engine failure due to misfueling during the stopover in Bombay. The accident was the second hull loss of the Convair 990; it was also the first accident involving the type to result in fatalities.

Aircraft 
The aircraft involved in the accident was a Convair CV-990-30A-5 jet airliner powered by four General Electric CJ805-23B turbofan engines with registration PK-GJA. The 1961-built aircraft was the third Convair 990 produced, with serial number 30-10-3, and was initially destined for American Airlines. The aircraft was configured to carry up to 99 passengers and was named Pajajaran after the capital city of the Sunda Kingdom. Formerly used as one of the testbed aircraft to certify the Convair 990 type, the aircraft was later converted to the Convair 990A variant afterward. Garuda Indonesian Airways took delivery of the aircraft on 24 January 1964 as the last of three aircraft on order.

Flight and crash 
Garuda Indonesian Airways Flight 892 arrived at Bombay–Santacruz Airport at 01:45 a.m. local time (08:15 p.m. UTC 27 May). Having originated in Jakarta with stopovers in Singapore and Bangkok, the flight was part of the airline's Jakarta–Singapore–Bangkok–Bombay–Karachi–Cairo–Rome–Amsterdam milk run. The flight made the stopover in Bombay to pick up more passengers, change operating crew members, and refuel the aircraft before continuing with the flight's next segment to Karachi. Eleven passengers were supposed to board the flight in Bombay, but five passengers canceled their tickets at the last moment, leaving the remaining six to board the flight. Weather conditions at Bombay–Santacruz Airport reportedly were normal and without strong winds at the time of the flight's departure from Bombay to Karachi with 15 passengers and 14 crew on board.

The aircraft took off from Bombay–Santacruz Airport at 02:32 a.m. local time (09:02 p.m. UTC 27 May). Seven minutes later, the air traffic control (ATC) at Bombay Airport lost contact with the aircraft; Bombay Airport's ATC did not receive any distress calls from the aircraft before the contact went lost. The aircraft was then reported to have crashed at 02:44 a.m. (09:14 p.m.

All 29 passengers and crew on board the aircraft died in the accident. Seventeen people in Bilalpada village reportedly were injured, two of which were severe. Three villagers had to get hospitalized; one was later pronounced dead. Besides human casualties, the crash destroyed several villagers' huts and a school-owned shed. Moreover, some of the burning debris from the aircraft hit and set a stable ablaze, killing 19 buffaloes.

Passengers and crew 
Garuda Indonesian Airways Flight 892 carried 15 passengers on the flight's Bombay to Karachi segment. In terms of departure cities, six passengers boarded the flight in Jakarta, three in Bangkok, and six in Bombay. In terms of destination cities, six passengers would disembark the flight in Karachi, two in Cairo, two in Rome, and five in Amsterdam. Six passengers were from Indonesia, four were from Pakistan, two were from Greece, one was from India, one was from Japan, and one was from the Netherlands. Among the six passengers from Indonesia was an official of the country's  and the wife of G. A. Siwabessy, the head of the same agency and Indonesian Minister of Health at the time. The only passenger from India was the president of the Institution of Engineers (India) and vice president of the International Federation for Pre-stressed Concrete. The only passenger from the Netherlands was a Dutch leader of the Moral Re-Armament.

The flight had 14 crew members on board; all were from Indonesia. Ten were the operating crew on the flight, consisting of four cockpit crew and six cabin crew, while the remaining four were deadheading crew. The cockpit crew members were Captain Abdul Rohim, Captain Soedharmono, Flight navigator Asmoro, and Flight engineer Djumadi. Of the cabin crew members, one of the two pursers was the younger brother of A. Y. Mokoginta, the Indonesian Ambassador to Egypt at the time. All the operating crew members boarded the flight in Bombay to replace the original crew members set that had worked since the flight originated in Jakarta. These newly-boarded crew members were to be replaced by another set of crew members in Cairo. Meanwhile, the four deadheading crew members, all originating from Jakarta with the original operating crew members, remained on board the flight.

Investigation 
In the hours after the accident, several representatives from the Indian Directorate General of Civil Aviation arrived at the crash site and conducted a preliminary investigation. A joint team from Indonesia, which included representatives from the Indonesian Directorate of Civil Aviation, Garuda Indonesian Airways, and Lufthansa, was dispatched to Bombay to join the investigation. They arrived in Bombay the following morning. The search for the aircraft's flight recorder began the day after the arrival of the Indonesian team at the crash site.

The cause of the accident is unclear, even though a court of inquiry was established to determine it. The court of inquiry was led by Y. S. Tambe, a retired Chief Justice of the Bombay High Court, and the accident report reportedly would be completed by January 1970. However, the error of the ground staff at Bombay–Santacruz Airport, which refueled the jet airliner with avgas instead of kerosene-based avtur, is presumed as the probable cause of the accident. The alleged consequence is that all of the aircraft's four engines experienced a partial or complete failure during the climbout, causing the pilots to lose control of the aircraft. The aircraft then entered a nosedive until it eventually crashed in an almost vertical attitude.

Aftermath 
President Suharto of Indonesia sent an aircraft from Garuda Indonesian Airways to repatriate all deceased Indonesians in the accident. Several stones were taken from the crash site and put inside each coffin of the Indonesian victims. Most of the deceased Indonesian passengers were buried in public cemeteries, while the wife of the health minister and the entire crew members were buried in a heroes' cemetery.

Following the accident, Garuda Indonesian Airways grounded the remaining two Convair 990A aircraft in its fleet and suspended the Jakarta–Amsterdam and vice versa milk run service. The latter would later get reinstated, but the operating aircraft for the flight got replaced by the Douglas DC-8 on lease from KLM. The two Convair 990A aircraft were relegated to fly on domestic and international Asian routes until the airline eventually phased out the type in 1973.

See also 

 List of Garuda Indonesia incidents and accidents

References 

1968 in India
1968 in Indonesia
Accidents and incidents involving the Convair 990 Coronado
Airliner accidents and incidents with an unknown cause
Aviation accidents and incidents in 1968
Aviation accidents and incidents in India
Flight 892